Showbiz Tycoon is a 2000 Hong Kong semi-biographical television drama loosely based on the life of Hong Kong entertainment mogul Run Run Shaw, founder of film company Shaw Brothers Studio and television company TVB. The drama stars Michael Tao as Shaw, Carina Lau as Shaw's wife Mona Fong, Wayne Lai and Alex Fong respectively as Leonard Ho and Raymond Chow, Shaw's former business partners and founders of Golden Harvest, Shaw Brothers' rival company.

Cast

References

External links
Showbiz Tycoon at Douban
Showbiz Tycoon at Legend Music

Asia Television original programming
2000 Hong Kong television series debuts
2000 Hong Kong television series endings
Television series about show business
Works about mass media owners
Works about film directors and producers
Works about actors
2000s Hong Kong television series
Cultural depictions of Bruce Lee
Cultural depictions of Jackie Chan